Kazablan is a 1973 Israeli musical film directed by Menahem Golan and written by Menahem Golan and Haim Hefer. The film stars Yehoram Gaon, Efrat Lavie, Arieh Elias, Etti Grotes and Yehuda Efroni. The film was released on May 8, 1974, by Metro-Goldwyn-Mayer.

Plot 
The plot follows that of the musical of the same name.

Cast 
 Yehoram Gaon as Kazablan
 Efrat Lavie as Rachel
 Arieh Elias as Moshiko
 Etti Grotes as Maryuma
 Yehuda Efroni as Mr. Feldman
 Gita Luka as Mrs. Feldman
 Aliza Azikri as Singer
 Yossi Graber as Yanush
 Misha Asherov as Josh
 Abraham Ronai as Sarevsky
 Ya'ackov Ben-Sira as Mr. Spiegel 
 Gabi Ohad as Mrs. Spiegel
 Chaim Banai as Mr. Shimon
 Geula Yeffet as Mrs. Shimon
 Yaacov Timan as Russian Neighbor
 Miriam Oleinik
 Zvi Borodo as Mr. Nissimov
 Madeline Rahmimov as Mrs. Nissimov
 Victor Atar as Sgt. Mizrahi
 Moshe Hillel as Mohel
 Mutzi Aviv as Nikko
 Nurit Amir

References

External links 
 

1973 films
Israeli musical comedy films
Metro-Goldwyn-Mayer films
Films set in Israel
Films shot in Israel
1970s musical comedy films
Films directed by Menahem Golan
1973 comedy films
Films produced by Menahem Golan
Films with screenplays by Menahem Golan
1970s Hebrew-language films